The Battle of Sokolka took place on April 23, 1709, near the town of Poltava, Ukraine, during the ninth year of the Great Northern War. The Swedish army of close to 3,000 cavalry under the command of Carl Gustaf Kruse and 3,500 Cossacks of Kost Gordiyenko and Ivan Mazepa launched a surprise attack on a Russian camp of about 3,000 cavalrymen and 2,000 Cossacks under Karl Evald von Rönne. Although encamped and taken by surprise, the Russians were immediately alerted and successfully counterattacked, cutting their way through the enemy forces, and eventually escaped, having captured 4 guns left behind by the fleeing Zaporozhian Cossacks and a number of prisoners. The battle was fought in fog, both sides claimed victory. It was one of the encounters shortly before the decisive battle of Poltava which would seriously cripple the Swedish chances of victory in the war.

References

Literature 
 Peter From, Katastrofen vid Poltava (2007), Lund, Historiska media.

Sokolki
Sokolki
1709 in Ukraine
Sokolki
Sokolki
Sokolki
History of Poltava Oblast